Busters is a five-member South Korean girl group formed by Marbling E&M Inc. and JTG Entertainment in 2017.

History
Busters were formed to promote Monstergram’s upcoming TV series Idol Rangers Power Busters. Prior to their debut, the group promoted with Chaeyeon, Jisoo, Hyungseo, Minji, and Soyeon. Soyeon left the group and was replaced by Minjung. They released their debut single album Dream On on November 27, 2017, and they made a comeback with their second single album Grapes on June 12, 2018.

On January 26, 2019, it was announced through the Marbling official YouTube account that Minjung had left the group. She was replaced by Yeseo at the end of the month. They released their first extended play Pinky Promise on July 31, 2019, marking the official debut of member Yeseo.  On November 18, 2019, it was announced that Minji had left the group due to personal reasons.  On December 10, 2019, it was announced through the Busters official fan cafe that Jieun had joined the group.

On March 17, 2020, Marbling Entertainment added two new members to Busters, Takara and Jeon Minji, making Busters a six-member group. On March 29, Hyungseo posted a letter to the official fan cafe announcing her departure due to her wanting to focus on her studies. Chaeyeon didn't participate in the comeback due to conflicting schedules caused by her MC position in Boni Hani.  The group made their comeback with their third single album Paeonia on May 13, 2020.

On August 6, 2020, Marbling Entertainment announced that the group would be on hiatus and be reorganized.  Jisoo, Yeseo, and Chaeyeon left the group to pursue acting and other activities, while the remaining members Minji, Jieun, and Takara would be joined by a foreign member to pursue promotions as Power Busters.

On May 20, 2021, Busters was reorganized into a five-member group, with the addition of members Seira and Minmin. On October 22, 2021, new member Yunji performed with Busters for the first time during a concert at Jeongdong Theater. On October 24, 2021, it was announced that Minmin had officially left the group.

On March 28, 2022, it was announced that Busters will make their re-debut with the single Re:Born on April 27.

On July 11, 2022, Busters released the new single album Tropical Romance.

Members
Jeon Ji-eun

Jeon Min-ji

Yunji

Former members 
Park So-yeon
Cha Min-jung
Kim Min-ji
Myung Hyung-seo
Kang Ye-seo
Kim Chae-yeon
Jung Ji-soo
Minmin

Timeline

Discography

Extended plays

Single albums

Singles

Filmography

Music videos

Awards and nominations

Korea Brand Awards

|-
| 2018
| Busters
| Female Rookie of the Year
| 
|-

Korea Culture Entertainment Awards

|-
| 2017
| rowspan=2|Busters
| Rookie of the Year
| 
|-
| 2018
| K-pop Singers Award
|

Korea Environment Culture Awards 

|-
| 2017
| Busters
| Global Asia Star Award in Culture
|

Korean Wave Awards 

|-
| 2019
| Busters
| Rising Star Award for Popular Culture
|

References

External links

South Korean girl groups
South Korean dance music groups
Musical groups established in 2017
K-pop music groups
Musical groups from Seoul
2017 establishments in South Korea
South Korean pop music groups
Musical quintets